The Emily State Forest is a state forest located near the town of Emily in the Crow Wing County, Minnesota. In addition to hiking and hunting, backcountry camping is allowed within the forest, defined campsites are located at the nearby Crow Wing State Forest and Land O'Lakes State Forest.

See also
List of Minnesota state forests

External links
Emily State Forest - Minnesota Department of Natural Resources (DNR)

References

Minnesota state forests
Protected areas of Crow Wing County, Minnesota
Protected areas established in 1963